Trevor Kennerd (born December 23, 1955) was a kicker for the Winnipeg Blue Bombers in the Canadian Football League (CFL) from 1980-1991. He was a three-time CFL All-Star (1981, 1985 Football Reporters of Canada All-Star and 1983 Coaches All-Star) and helped the Blue Bombers to three Grey Cup victories (1984, 1988, 1990), including kicking the winning field-goal in the 1988 Grey Cup.  He was inducted into the Winnipeg Blue Bomber Hall of Fame in 1997 and was selected as one of the 20 Blue Bombers All-Time Greats in 2005.

While playing with the Bombers, Kennerd worked as an accounts manager for Wordsnorth Communications Services.  Kennerd is currently the president of TKM Inc., a marketing communications firm in Winnipeg, Manitoba, Canada, and is the former Honorary Colonel for 435 Transport and Rescue Squadron located at 17 Wing Winnipeg.

Electoral history

References

1955 births
Alberta Golden Bears football players
Canadian football placekickers
Canadian sportsperson-politicians
Conservative Party of Canada candidates for the Canadian House of Commons
Living people
Players of Canadian football from Alberta
Players of Canadian football from Manitoba
Canadian football people from Calgary
Canadian football people from Winnipeg
Winnipeg Blue Bombers players